Caleb Hearon (born 1995) is an American comedian, writer and actor. He performed stand-up regularly in Chicago and also performed at iO Theater until relocating to Los Angeles in 2020. Hearon is a writer for the series Human Resources.

Early life and education 
Hearon was born on January 24, 1995 and grew up in a rural, conservative town- Brookfield,Missouri. He was raised in a Christian household and was an active member of his church. He recognized he was gay from adolescence and, as a result of his religion, struggled with his sexuality. Hearon came out as gay after college.

Hearon attended Missouri State University as an undergraduate with plans to eventually enroll in law school or another graduate program. He joined the improv team and that catalyzed his decision to pursue a career in comedy. After graduation in 2017 he moved to Chicago with other members of the team.

Career 
Hearon's professional comedy career began in Chicago, where he performed a weekly variety show at iO Theater as well as a stand-up show, At What Cost?, every month at Lincoln Lodge. He later toured the showcase At What Cost? with fellow comedian and collaborator Holmes Holmes in Los Angeles and New York.

He gained wider prominence in 2019 for his comedic Twitter videos, which are frequently up close and forward-facing. While he had not previously used his social media accounts for comedy, he began to do so after auditioning for Saturday Night Live.

Hearon has acted in supporting roles on Work in Progress and Fargo. In 2020 he joined the writing staff for Human Resources, a Big Mouth spin-off series set to premiere in March 2022.

As of December 2020 he co-hosts the Headgum podcast Keeping Records with comedian Shelby Wolstein.

In June 2021, Hearon was announced as a series regular in the TBS pilot Space. He co-created and co-wrote Best Buds with Caitie Delaney, an animated series in development at Peacock and produced by Bandera Entertainment.

Personal life 
Hearon is gay. He relocated to Los Angeles from Chicago in 2020.

Accolades 
 2020 – 10 Comics to Watch, Variety

Filmography

Television

Film

Awards and nominations 

 2022 – Nominee, Breakthrough Social Star, MTV Movie & TV Awards

References

External links 

Official website

1995 births
Living people
American stand-up comedians
American television writers
21st-century American actors
Missouri State University alumni
Entertainers from Missouri
American gay actors
Gay comedians
American gay writers
21st-century LGBT people
Writers from Missouri
American LGBT comedians